Thrive Market is an American e-commerce membership-based retailer offering natural and organic food products. It was founded by Nick Green, Gunnar Lovelace, Kate Mulling, and Sasha Siddhartha. By 2016 they had raised $141 million across three rounds of funding following their launch in November 2014.

Described as "Costco meets Whole Foods", Thrive Market's business model is designed to simplify the supply chain by eliminating the markup typically applied by brick-and-mortar grocery stores.

Membership model 
For every paid Thrive Market membership, a free membership is donated to a family in need in the United States as part of the company's Thrive Gives program. 
 Students, teachers, veterans, and first responders are also eligible for free memberships. Thrive Market offers incentives with membership including discounts, free product gifts and samples with orders.

Shopping on Thrive Market 
Thrive Market carries more than 6,900 products from over 800 brands, including organic and non-GMO foods, ethically sourced meat and seafood, nontoxic home and beauty products, organic and biodynamic wine, and items for babies and kids. The company allows users to filter their search results by more than 70 different diets and lifestyle choices. Examples of filters include vegan, paleo, keto, gluten-free, Fair Trade Certified, and Non-GMO Project Verified. As of September 4, 2019, Thrive Market is the first retailer to use the Glyphosate Residue Free certification, created by the Detox Project, a research and certification platform.

History 
Thrive Market was launched in November 2014 to address the geographical and monetary challenges that bar communities from healthy food. Lovelace grew up on an organic farm in Ojai, California and saw firsthand the power of group buying as a way to both make healthy food affordable and build community.

When Green and Lovelace initially tried to raise money for Thrive Market, they were rejected by more than 50 venture-capital firms. They then focused on building a network of more than 200 health and wellness investors—including Deepak Chopra, Tony Robbins, and Jillian Michaels—to support Thrive Market individually. As of 2016, Thrive Market has raised $141 million from Greycroft Partners, E-Ventures, Cross Culture Ventures, and Invus, as well as from celebrities including John Legend, Will Smith, and Demi Moore.

Thrive Market members pay an annual membership fee of $59.95 and receive free shipping for orders amounting to more than $49.

Thrive Market has two fulfillment centers from which distribution is made, one at Batesville, Indiana, and another at Tahoe Reno Industrial Center near Reno, Nevada. They advertise delivery to 85% of the United States within two days. The company currently employs more than 500 people.

In February 2016, Thrive Market launched a mobile app, available for iOS and Android systems. 

Co-founders Nick Green and Gunnar Lovelace appeared on CBS This Morning in May 2016.

In June 2016, Thrive Market launched an online petition asking the USDA to accept food stamps online.

Products 
Thrive Market is the largest national retailer of exclusively non-GMO foods. They launched their own product line in November 2015, aiming to develop affordable products in categories where there is not enough margin to cover cost. They currently offer more than over 800 different Thrive Market branded items by SKUs, including coconut oil, tomato sauce, olive oil, baking goods, and spices. Thrive has recently launched two new Thrive sub-brands, Rosey and f.a.e. Rosey is a line of home cleaning products and constitutes over 35 SKUs while f.a.e. currently has 55 SKUs.

Thrive Gives Program and Donations 
During 2016, Thrive Market noted that they had given away more than 350,000 memberships. Thrive Market also has provided memberships and stipends for families affected by Walmart closings in Wichita, Kansas, Denver, Colorado, and Chicago, Illinois; areas affected by water shortages in Flint, Michigan; and areas affected by floods in Louisiana. Thrive Market also works closely with the True Sioux Hope Foundation to provide healthy offerings for native communities, During the 2015 holiday season, Thrive Market teamed up with Feeding America to allow customers to donate their shopping savings to the nonprofit at checkout. In early 2016, they launched a campaign entitled, Spread the Health, which allows customers to donate a portion of their savings at checkout with every dollar donated going directly into the shopping cart of a low-income Thrive Gives family.

USDA petition 

Soon after the petition launched, Gunnar Lovelace participated in a congressional briefing hosted by Congressman Tim Ryan and actress-activist Shailene Woodley. Lovelace also met with Senior Nutrition Policy Advisor Debra Eschmeyer and USDA officials in the White House. On September 25, 2016, the USDA announced plans for its pilot program for online shopping and called for volunteers to apply for participation.

Criticism of Thrive Market 
Thrive Market attracts new users through free trial memberships, which last one month before automatically renewing at an annual cost of $59.95 billed to the customer. As a membership-based platform, Thrive Market requires new users to sign up for a free trial or paid membership to access the full website. To cancel a trial or paid membership, members must contact Thrive Market's customer service by email, phone, or 24/7 online chat support.

The most common complaints about Thrive Market membership pertain to 1) customers claiming to be unaware of a membership fee and 2) customers claiming to have difficulty cancelling their memberships. After a customer provides an email address to gain access to the website or start a membership, Thrive Market delivers daily promotions and one-day-only discounts via its email marketing channel. This has resulted in some customers complaining about receiving too many emails. Customers have also filed complaints against Thrive to the California Attorney General for misleading and deceptive conduct in which coupons indicating a certain percentage off (30%, for example) are capped at small dollar amounts without any reference to the cap.

References 

Online food retailers of the United States
American companies established in 2014
Food and drink companies based in Los Angeles
Privately held companies based in California
Social enterprises
B Lab-certified corporations